"Tree Climbers" is the seventh single from Japanese pop singer Kaela Kimura. It was released on September 6, 2006, and reached number six on the Japan Oricon singles chart. It is from the album Scratch.

Track listing

References

2006 singles
Kaela Kimura songs
Macaronic songs
Songs written by Kaela Kimura
2006 songs